Molierissimo  is a French animated television series in 26 25-minute episodes, produced by DIHR and broadcast October 1989 in Cabou Cadin 1 on Canal+. It was rebroadcast from 7 January 1992 in Amuse 3 on FR3.

Synopsis 
A young boy of ten named Quentin joins troop Molière one day, and journeys through the kingdom of France.

Episodes 
 The mask and sword
 The children in the family
 The illustrious theater
 Medea dress
 The traveling theater
 The stunned
 The fight for Paris
 The Prince de Conti
 The removal
 The vagaries of a large
 Mr. King's brother
 The big day
 The La Grange book
 The precious ridiculous
 The mare
 The arrest
 The bombshell
 The Royal Palace Theatre
 Fugue
 Vaux le Vicomte
 Exile
 The robbers
 Night harlequins
 Two young drums
 Women's school
 The pleasures of the enchanted island

Cast 

 Claude Giraud: Molière
 Tania Torrens: Madeleine Béjart
 Damien Boisseau: Quentin
 François Chaumette: Bonaventure
 Albert Augier: Cardinal Mazarin
 Vincent Ropion: Louis XIV
 Danièle Douet: Genevieve Bejart
 Jean-Pierre Delage: Molière's Father
 Paul Bisciglia: Pouillard (sidekick Marchenoir)
 Maurice Sarfati: Narrator, The Chassieux (sidekick Marchenoir)
 Maria Tamar: Anne of Austria
 Jean-Pierre Leroux: Mr. King's brother
 Anne Jarry: Clarisse Marquise de St Julien
 Nicole Hiss: Louise Verville
 Régis Lang: Comte de Verville
 Jean-Luc Kayser: D'Artagnan (first voice), Cyrano de Bergerac (second voice)
 Michel Le Royer: Cyrano de Bergerac (first voice)
 Jean-Paul Solal: D'Artagnan (second voice)
 Patrick Prejean: Scaramouche
 Roger Carel: the head of the Court of Miracles
 Claude Rollet: Comte de Rambouillet

External links 
 

1980s French animated television series
French children's animated adventure television series